This is a list of television programs broadcast by Steel in Italy.

Television series
Distretto di Polizia
E-Ring
Homicide: Life on the Street
Mike & Molly
Notruf Hafenkante
RIS Delitti Imperfetti
The West Wing

Syfy Universal
Fringe
Ghost Hunters International
Heroes
Moonlight
Sliders
Smallville
Space: 1999
Star Trek: The Original Series
Supernatural
Terminator: The Sarah Connor Chronicles
UFO

Mediaset
Programmes Steel
Steel